Kelepi Tanginoa (born 1 March 1994).

He previously played for the Parramatta Eels, North Queensland Cowboys and the Manly-Warringah Sea Eagles in the NRL.

Background
Tanginoa was born in Auburn, New South Wales, Australia.

He played his junior football for the Canley Heights Dragons, CVD Edensor Park Cobras and Cabramatta Two Blues before being signed by the Parramatta Eels, playing for their Harold Matthews Cup, SG Ball Cup and NYC teams. He attended Westfields Sport High School where he represented the Australian Schoolboys in 2012. In 2010, Tanginoa represented the New South Wales under-16s side and in 2012 represented the New South Wales under-18s.

Playing career

2013
In round 2 of the 2013 NRL season, Tanginoa made his NRL debut for the Eels against the Canterbury-Bankstown Bulldogs. In April, Tanginoa played for the New South Wales Under 20s team. He played 9 games for Parramatta in his rookie year before succumbing to a fractured hand and then a stress fracture in his right foot.  Parramatta would finish the 2013 NRL season in last place on the table for the second consecutive year.

In July 2013, Tanginoa re-signed with the Parramatta club on a two-year contract.

2014
On 29 August 2014, Tanginoa was released from his Parramatta contract, signing a two-year contract with North Queensland, starting in 2015.

2015
In round 2 of the 2015 NRL season, Tanginoa made his debut for North Queensland, coming off the bench in the side's 14-16 loss to the Newcastle Knights.

On 27 September 2015, Tanginoa played in the Townsville Blackhawks' Intrust Super Cup Grand Final loss to the Ipswich Jets. Tanginoa was a member of the Cowboys' 2015 Premiership winning squad, though he did not take part in the Grand Final.

2016
On 21 October 2015, Tanginoa signed a one-year contract to return to the Parramatta Eels, after being released from the final year of his Cowboys contract. He would spend the season playing for the Wentworthville Magpies in the NSW Cup.

2017
Tanginoa spent the first half of 2017 with Wentworthville before Parramatta released him from his contract. He then signed to play for the Manly-Warringah Sea Eagles.

2018
Tanginoa made 12 appearances for Manly in 2018 as the club avoided the wooden spoon by just 2 competition points.

2019
Tanginoa joined Super League side Wakefield Trinity for the Super League XXIV season.  He played 14 games for the club as they finished 9th on the table.

2020
Tanginoa at the end of the 2020 season, signed a new contract that would keep him at Wakefield Trinity until the end of the 2024 season.

2021
On 25 June 2021 he played for the Combined Nations All Stars in their 26-24 victory over England, staged at the Halliwell Jones Stadium, Warrington, as part of England’s 2021 Rugby League World Cup preparation.

Statistics

NRL
 Statistics are correct to the end of the 2019 season

References

External links
Wakefield Trinity profile
SL profile
Manly Sea Eagles profile
NRL profile
Parramatta Eels profile

1994 births
Living people
Australian sportspeople of Tongan descent
Australian expatriate sportspeople in England
Australian rugby league players
Cabramatta Two Blues players
Combined Nationalities rugby league team players
Junior Kangaroos players
Manly Warringah Sea Eagles players
North Queensland Cowboys players
Parramatta Eels players
Rugby league locks
Rugby league players from New South Wales
Rugby league second-rows
Tongan sportspeople
Townsville Blackhawks players
Wakefield Trinity players
Wentworthville Magpies players